14-3-3 protein gamma is a protein that in humans is encoded by the YWHAG gene.

This gene product belongs to the 14-3-3 protein family which mediate signal transduction by binding to phosphoserine-containing proteins. This highly conserved protein family is found in both plants and mammals, and this protein is 100% identical to the rat ortholog. It is induced by growth factors in human vascular smooth muscle cells, and is also highly expressed in skeletal and heart muscles, suggesting an important role for this protein in muscle tissue. It has been shown to interact with RAF1 and protein kinase C, proteins involved in various signal transduction pathways.

Interactions 

YWHAG has been shown to interact with C-Raf, EPB41L3, KIF1C and Stratifin.

References

Further reading

External links 
 

14-3-3 proteins